Saeid Ghalandari (born 17 February 1990) is an Iranian professional futsal player. He is currently a member of Ana Sanat in the Iranian Futsal Super League.

Club career

Ferdows
He scored his first goal in the Iranian Futsal Super League in a 4–2 win over Farsh Ara.

Honours 

 Iran Futsal's 1st Division
 Runners-up (1): 2016–17 (Ana Sanat)

References 

1990 births
Living people
People from Qom
Iranian men's futsal players
Futsal forwards
Ana Sanat FC players
Shahid Mansouri FSC players
Shahrdari Saveh FSC players